Bagaha Assembly constituency is an assembly constituency in Paschim Champaran district in the Indian state of Bihar. It was earlier reserved for scheduled castes.

Overview
As per orders of Delimitation of Parliamentary and Assembly constituencies Order, 2008, 4. Bagaha Assembly constituency is composed of the following: Bagaha community development block including 
Bagaha nagar parishad; and Bairagi, Sonbarsha, Vairati Bariarwa, Kharhat Tribhauni, Chamawalia and Paikwalia Maryadpur of Sidhaw CD Block.

Bagaha Assembly constituency is part of 1. Valmiki Nagar (Lok Sabha constituency). It was earlier part of Bagaha (Lok Sabha constituency).

Members of Legislative Assembly 

^ by-poll

Election results

2020

2015

2010

References

External links
 

Assembly constituencies of Bihar
Politics of West Champaran district